The Vulture Mountains is a  long, arid, low-elevation mountain range located in northwest Maricopa County, Arizona, United States. It is in the north perimeter region of the Sonoran Desert. The Arizona transition zone mountain ranges lie north and northeast, just north of Wickenburg, Arizona. It is also a viewpoint southwest and southeast of the desert regions, including the Vulture Mountains.

Description and geography
The northeast is followed by the course of a southeast stretch of the Hassayampa River; the river turns due-south west of Morristown, on US 60, making the east terminus of the range about 7 mi wide, at the rivers floodplain. The Hassayampa enters the north of the Hassayampa Plain, so a small river canyon region lies at the Vulture Mountain's northeast, with the Wickenburg Mountains northeast, and the Hieroglyphic Mountains east.

The high point of the range is Vulture Peak,, at the center east of the range. Another major peak anchors the west region of the range, Black Butte, at ).

Access
The major access to the north and east foothills of the Vulture Mountains is by way of U.S. Route 60. The route traverses from Aguila at the northwest, Wickenburg at the northeast, and a southeast stretch at the mountains northeast, with the route paralleling the Hassayampa River.

A paved route dissects the range on a south-southwest direction from Wickenburg, which lies on the mountain range's foothills, with the route being east of the mountain range center. Numerous unimproved routes exit from the route into the mountain areas, or they access the southern side of the mountain range-(the north of the Hassayampa Plain).

Unimproved routes are restricted on the east side foothills, since it is the floodplain, watershed region of the Hassayampa River, where the riverbed has widened to up to 1.5 mi in some locales. One major unimproved route crosses the Hassayampa west from Morristown.

Historic structures of the Vulture Mine and City
In 1863, after Henry Wickenburg discovered the Vulture Mine, Vulture City, a small mining town was established in the area. The town once had a population of 5,000 citizens. After the mine closed the city was deserted and became a ghost town. The following are images with a brief description of the Vulture Mine and Vulture City, both located in the Vulture Mountains. Some of the structures are still present in what once was known as Vulture City located in the mountain.

See also
Vulture Mine
Henry Wickenburg
Wickenburg, Arizona
Vulture City, Arizona
List of mountain ranges of Maricopa County, Arizona

References

 Arizona Road & Recreation Atlas, Benchmark Maps, 2nd Edition, c. 1998, 112 pages, pp. 45, 46, 79, 80.
 Arizona DeLorme Atlas & Gazetteer, 5th Edition, c. 2002, 76 pages, pp. 48–49.

External links

Vulture Peak, (lat-long.com), (coordinates)

Mountain ranges of the Sonoran Desert
Mountain ranges of Maricopa County, Arizona
Mountain ranges of Arizona